The Kulcsár Anita-emléktorna is an annual handball tournament, which takes place in Dunaújváros in August or September, and is organized in the honor of former Hungarian international handball player Anita Kulcsár, who died in a car accident in 2005.

Tournament structure

The first edition of the competition was held in August 2005, and since then every year usually two Hungarian teams play against two top teams from other countries. In 2007 six teams participated on the event, while in 2009 a single match decided the winner of the tournament, in which Győri Audi ETO KC beat CS Oltchim Râmnicu Vâlcea.

Summary

See also
 Szabella-kupa

References

External links 
 Anita Kulcsár Memorial Site 

Handball competitions in Europe
Women's handball competitions